D'Aboville is a French surname. Notable people with the surname include:

Augustin-Marie d'Aboville (1776–1843), French military officer
Gérard d'Aboville (born 1945), French rower and politician

French-language surnames